Invariant and invariance may refer to:

Computer science
 Invariant (computer science), an expression whose value doesn't change during program execution
 Loop invariant, a property of a program loop that is true before (and after) each iteration
 A data type in method overriding that is neither covariant nor contravariant
 Class invariant, an invariant used to constrain objects of a class

Physics, mathematics, and statistics
 Invariant (mathematics), a property of a mathematical object that is not changed by a specific operation or transformation
 Rotational invariance, the property of function whose value does not change when arbitrary rotations are applied to its argument
 Scale invariance, a property of objects or laws that do not change if scales of length, energy, or other variables, are multiplied by a common factor
 Topological invariant
 Invariant (physics), something does not change under a transformation, such as from one reference frame to another
 Invariant estimator in statistics
 Measurement invariance, a statistical property of measurement
 Oxford University Invariant Society, an Oxford student mathematics club

Other uses
 Invariant (linguistics), a word that does not undergo inflection
 Invariant (music)
 Writer invariant, property of a text which is similar in all texts of a given author, and different in texts of different authors
 Invariance (magazine), a French Communist journal
 Invariances, a 2001 book by philosopher Robert Nozick

See also